Takeley Football Club is an English football club based in Takeley, Essex.

History
The club were established in 1903, and joined the Essex Olympian League in 1978. They won the league in 1987–88 and 2001–02, and in 2006–07, won the Essex Premier Cup. After finishing as runners-up in 2007–08, the club was accepted into the Essex Senior League, finishing third in their first season. They also achieved third-place finishes in 2011-12 and 2012-13.

Honours
Essex Intermediate/Olympian League
Division One champions 1987–88, 2001–02
Division Two champions 1993–94
Essex Premier Cup
Winners 2006–07

Records

Best FA Cup performance: Preliminary round, 2012–13
Best FA Vase performance: Second round, 2012–13

References

External links
Club website

Football clubs in England
Essex Senior Football League
Association football clubs established in 1903
Football clubs in Essex
1903 establishments in England
Takeley